Urapteroides astheniata is a moth of the family Uraniidae first described by Achille Guenée in 1857. It is found in south-east Asia, from India, Sri Lanka to Fiji, including New Guinea and the tropical north of Australia.

Description
The wingspan is about 60–76 mm. Body white. Palpi with a black line on the upperside. A black frontal line and spot found on vertex of head. Forewings with some black strigae from the costa. Six oblique fuscous bands, one sub-basal, another on discocellulars, the others medial, postmedial, sub-marginal and marginal. Some fuscous striae found on each side of the sub-marginal band. Hindwings with a fuscous band on inner margin joined at anal angle by a band from the upper angle of cell and almost met by one from the costa beyond the middle. Some submarginal striae can be seen. A black marginal line runs from the apex to the tail, and a very narrow line with three spots inside it from the tail to anal angle. Cilia black tipped.

Larva pale reddish yellow, tinged green, with reddish transverse stripes dorsally. Three comma-like greenish markings found centrally on each segment. Last instars are more greenish with variable markings. Head and prothorax glossy greenish. Spiracles dark. The larvae feed on Endospermum species.

References

Uraniidae